Tanakia lanceolata  is a temperate freshwater fish belonging to the Acheilognathinae sub-family of the  family Cyprinidae.  It originates in inland waterways in China, Japan and the Korean peninsula. It was originally described as Capoeta lanceolata by Temminck & Schlegel in 1846, and has also been referred to as Acheilognathus lanceolata and Acheilognathus lanceolatus in scientific publications. Its Korean name is 납자루 (napjaru, meaning "slender bitterling"), and in Japanese is known as ヤリタナゴ (槍鱮 - yaritanago)

References 

 

Tanakia
Freshwater fish of China
Freshwater fish of Japan
Fish of Korea
Taxa named by Coenraad Jacob Temminck
Taxa named by Hermann Schlegel
Fish described in 1846